Anabasis prompta is a species of snout moth. It was described by Y.L. Du, S.M. Song and C.S. Wu in 2009. It is found in China (Guangxi).

References

Moths described in 2009
Phycitinae